Sweden participated in the Eurovision Song Contest 2021 in Rotterdam, the Netherlands.

Background 

Sweden had won the contest on six occasions: in 1974 with the song "Waterloo" performed by ABBA, in 1984 with the song "Diggi-Loo Diggi-Ley" performed by Herreys, in 1991 with the song "" performed by Carola, in 1999 with the song "Take Me to Your Heaven" performed by Charlotte Nilsson, in 2012 with the song "Euphoria" performed by Loreen, and in 2015 with the song "Heroes" performed by Måns Zelmerlöw.

The Swedish national broadcaster, Sveriges Television (SVT), broadcasts the event within Sweden and organises the selection process for the nation's entry. Since 1959, SVT has organised the annual competition  in order to select the Swedish entry for the Eurovision Song Contest.

Before Eurovision

Melodifestivalen 2021 

Four heats, a Second Chance round and a final were held. It was held between 6 February and 13 March 2021 and all shows were held at the Annexet in Stockholm without an audience.

Heats and Second Chance round 

 The first heat took place on 6 February 2021. "" performed by Danny Saucedo and "" performed by Arvingarna qualified directly to the final, while "The Missing Piece" performed by Paul Rey and "Pretender" performed by Lillasyster advanced to the Second Chance round. "One Touch" performed by Kadiatou, "Horizon" performed by Jessica Andersson, and "Fingerprints" performed by Nathalie Brydolf were eliminated from the contest.
 The second heat took place on 13 February 2021. "Little Tot" performed by Dotter and "New Religion" performed by Anton Ewald qualified directly to the final, while "" performed by Eva Rydberg and Ewa Roos and "The Silence" performed by Frida Green advanced to the Second Chance round. "Rich" performed by Julia Alfrida, "" performed by Wahl featuring Sami, and "Tears Run Dry" performed by Patrik Jean, were eliminated from the contest.
 The third heat took place on 20 February 2021. "Voices" performed by Tusse and "Still Young" performed by Charlotte Perrelli qualified directly to the final, while "" performed by Alvaro Estrella and "Beat of Broken Hearts" performed by Klara Hammarström advanced to the Second Chance round. "" performed by Emil Assergård, "Contagious" performed by Mustasch, and "" performed by Elisa were eliminated from the contest.
 The fourth heat took place on 27 February 2021. "In the Middle" performed by the Mamas and "Every Minute" performed by Eric Saade qualified directly to the final, while "Best of Me" performed by Efraim Leo and "" performed by Clara Klingenström advanced to the Second Chance round. "Good Life" performed by Tess Merkel, "" performed by Lovad, and "All Inclusive" performed by Sannex were eliminated from the contest.
 The Second Chance round took place on 6 March 2021. "" performed by Alvaro Estrella, "The Missing Piece" performed by Paul Rey, "" performed by Clara Klingenström, and "Beat of Broken Hearts" performed by Klara Hammarström qualified to the final.

Final 
The final took place on 13 March 2021.

At Eurovision 
According to Eurovision rules, all nations with the exceptions of the host country and the "Big Five" (France, Germany, Italy, Spain and the United Kingdom) are required to qualify from one of two semi-finals in order to compete in the final; the top ten countries from each semi-final progress to the final. The European Broadcasting Union (EBU) split up the competing countries into six different pots based on voting patterns from previous contests, with countries with favourable voting histories put into the same pot. For the 2021 contest, the semi-final allocation draw held for 2020 which was held on 28 January 2020, will be used. Sweden was placed into the first semi-final, to be held on 18 May 2021, and was scheduled to perform in the first half of the show.

Semi-final 
Once all the competing songs for the 2021 contest had been released, the running order for the semi-finals was decided by the shows' producers rather than through another draw, so that similar songs were not placed next to each other. Sweden was set to perform in position 4, following the entry from Russia and preceding the entry from Australia.

On 18 May, the day the semi-final was held, Sweden qualified for the Grand Final.

Final 
Sweden performed 25th in the grand final on 22 May 2021, following Italy and preceding San Marino.

Voting 
Voting during the three shows involved each country awarding two sets of points from 1-8, 10 and 12: one from their professional jury and the other from televoting. Each nation's jury consisted of five music industry professionals who are citizens of the country they represent, with a diversity in gender and age represented. The judges assess each entry based on the performances during the second Dress Rehearsal of each show, which takes place the night before each live show, against a set of criteria including: vocal capacity; the stage performance; the song's composition and originality; and the overall impression by the act. Jury members may only take part in panel once every three years, and are obliged to confirm that they are not connected to any of the participating acts in a way that would impact their ability to vote impartially. Jury members should also vote independently, with no discussion of their vote permitted with other jury members. The exact composition of the professional jury, and the results of each country's jury and televoting were released after the grand final; the individual results from each jury member were also released in an anonymised form.

Points awarded to Sweden

Points awarded by Sweden

Detailed voting results 
The following members comprised the Swedish jury:
 Emelie Fjällström
 Nanne Grönvall
 Björn Kjellman
 
 Omar Rudberg

References

External links
 

2021
Countries in the Eurovision Song Contest 2021
Eurovision
Eurovision